Raphaël Nzabakomada-Yakoma (1944–1985) was a Central African writer and historian. He was born in Baboua, Central African Republic in 1944, during the Kongo-Wara War.

Education 
Raphaël Nzabakomada-Yakoma earned his Ph.D. in History in France, where he studied at the Paris West University Nanterre La Défense and the Paris Diderot University.

Career 
Raphaël Nzabakomada-Yakoma worked at the Faculty of Literature and Human Sciences in Bangui (1972–1982), where he was Dean from 1976 to 1979. He was dismissed after the events of January–April 1979. He was Principal of the Department of History and Conference Master until his death in 1985.

Publications

 Raphaël Nzabakomada-Yakoma, L'Afrique centrale insurgée. La guerre du Kongo-Wara 1928-1931, Paris, éditions L'Harmattan, 1986

References

Central African Republic non-fiction writers
Central African Republic historians
20th-century historians
1944 births
1985 deaths
People from Nana-Mambéré
Academic staff of the University of Bangui